Sala Monferrato is a comune (municipality) in the Province of Alessandria in the Italian region Piedmont, located about  east of Turin and about  northwest of Alessandria.

Sala Monferrato borders the following municipalities: Cella Monte, Cereseto, Ottiglio, Ozzano Monferrato, and Treville.

Demographic evolution

References

Cities and towns in Piedmont